"Girl Watcher" is a song written by Ronald B. Killette and Wayne Pittman and performed by The O'Kaysions. It was produced by North State Music. The single was first released in March 1968 on North State Records, but it did not become a hit until re-released in June 1968 on ABC Records.

"Girl Watcher" received gold record status for a million sales from the R.I.A.A. in December 1968.

Chart performance
It reached #5 on the Billboard Hot 100 and #6 on the Billboard Hot Rhythm & Blues Singles chart in 1968 and was featured on the group's 1968 album, Girl Watcher.

The single ranked #45 on the Billboard Year-End Hot 100 singles of 1968.

Other versions
Tam White released it as a single in 1968 in the UK.
Spontaneous Combustion, on their 2004 album Strike Anywhere.
Beau Jocque and the Zydeco Hi-Rollers, with the title "I'm a Girl Watcher," on the 1999 album Zydeco Giant.
 Wheel of Fortune commissioned a version with lyrics adapted to promote the TV show called, “I’m a Wheel watcher”.

References

1968 songs
1968 singles
The O'Kaysions songs
ABC Records singles
Decca Records singles